Sahasam may refer to:

Saahasam (1981 film), a Malayalam film of 1981
Sahasam (1992 film), a Telugu film
Sahasam (2013 film), a Telugu film 
Saagasam, a 2016 Tamil film